The following is an alphabetical list of articles related to the U.S. state of Mississippi.

0–9 

.ms.us – Internet second-level domain for the state of Mississippi
20th state to join the United States of America

A
Abortion in Mississippi
Adams-Onís Treaty of 1819
Adjacent states:

African Americans in Mississippi
Agriculture in Mississippi
Airports in Mississippi
Arboreta in Mississippi
commons:Category:Arboreta in Mississippi
Archaeology of Mississippi
:Category:Archaeological sites in Mississippi
commons:Category:Archaeological sites in Mississippi
Architecture of Mississippi
Art museums and galleries in Mississippi
commons:Category:Art museums and galleries in Mississippi
Astronomical observatories in Mississippi
commons:Category:Astronomical observatories in Mississippi

B
Battle of Big Black River Bridge
Battle of Booneville
Battle of Brices Cross Roads
Battle of Camp Davies
Battle of Champion Hill
Battle of Chickasaw Bayou
Battle of Coffeeville
Battle of Grand Gulf
Battle of Iuka
Battle of Jackson, Mississippi
Battle of Okolona
Battle of Port Gibson
Battle of Raymond
Battle of Snyder's Bluff
Black Belt
Botanical gardens in Mississippi
commons:Category:Botanical gardens in Mississippi
Buildings and structures in Mississippi
commons:Category:Buildings and structures in Mississippi

C

Capital of the state of Mississippi
Capitol of the State of Mississippi
commons:Category:Mississippi State Capitol
Capital punishment in Mississippi
Casinos in Mississippi
Census statistical areas of Mississippi
Cities in Mississippi
commons:Category:Cities in Mississippi
Climate of Mississippi
Climate change in Mississippi 

Colleges and universities in Mississippi
commons:Category:Universities and colleges in Mississippi
Communications in Mississippi
commons:Category:Communications in Mississippi
Companies in Mississippi
Congressional districts of Mississippi
Constitution of the State of Mississippi
Convention centers in Mississippi
commons:Category:Convention centers in Mississippi
Counties of the state of Mississippi
commons:Category:Counties in Mississippi
Culture of Mississippi
commons:Category:Mississippi culture

D
Demographics of Mississippi

E
Economy of Mississippi
:Category:Economy of Mississippi
commons:Category:Economy of Mississippi
Education in Mississippi
:Category:Education in Mississippi
commons:Category:Education in Mississippi
Elections in the state of Mississippi
:Category:Mississippi elections
commons:Category:Mississippi elections
Environment of Mississippi
commons:Category:Environment of Mississippi

F

Flag of the state of Mississippi
Forts in Mississippi
:Category:Forts in Mississippi
commons:Category:Forts in Mississippi

G

Geography of Mississippi
:Category:Geography of Mississippi
commons:Category:Geography of Mississippi
Geology of Mississippi
commons:Category:Geology of Mississippi
Ghost towns in Mississippi
:Category:Ghost towns in Mississippi
commons:Category:Ghost towns in Mississippi
Ghosts of Mississippi
Government of the state of Mississippi  website
:Category:Government of Mississippi
commons:Category:Government of Mississippi
Governor of the State of Mississippi
List of governors of Mississippi
Great Seal of the State of Mississippi
Gun laws in Mississippi

H
High schools of Mississippi
Higher education in Mississippi
Highway routes in Mississippi
Hiking trails in Mississippi
commons:Category:Hiking trails in Mississippi
History of Mississippi
Historical outline of Mississippi
History of Italians in Mississippi
Holly Springs Raid
Hospitals in Mississippi
House of Representatives of the State of Mississippi

I
Images of Mississippi
commons:Category:Mississippi
Interstate highway routes in Mississippi
Islands of Mississippi

J
Jackson, Mississippi, state capital since 1821

K

L
Lakes of Mississippi
commons:Category:Lakes of Mississippi
Landmarks in Mississippi
commons:Category:Landmarks in Mississippi
LGBT rights in Mississippi
Lieutenant Governor of the State of Mississippi
Lists related to the state of Mississippi:
List of airports in Mississippi
List of census-designated places in Mississippi
List of census statistical areas in Mississippi
List of cities in Mississippi
List of colleges and universities in Mississippi
List of United States congressional districts in Mississippi
List of counties in Mississippi
List of forts in Mississippi
List of ghost towns in Mississippi
List of governors of Mississippi
List of high schools in Mississippi
List of highway routes in Mississippi
List of hospitals in Mississippi
List of individuals executed in Mississippi
List of Interstate highway routes in Mississippi
List of islands of Mississippi
List of law enforcement agencies in Mississippi
List of lieutenant governors of Mississippi
List of museums in Mississippi
List of National Historic Landmarks in Mississippi
List of newspapers in Mississippi
List of people from Mississippi
List of radio stations in Mississippi
List of railroads in Mississippi
List of Registered Historic Places in Mississippi
List of rivers of Mississippi
List of school districts in Mississippi
List of state highway routes in Mississippi
List of state parks in Mississippi
List of state prisons in Mississippi
List of symbols of the state of Mississippi
List of television stations in Mississippi
List of United States congressional delegations from Mississippi
List of United States congressional districts in Mississippi
List of United States representatives from Mississippi
List of United States senators from Mississippi
List of U.S. highway routes in Mississippi
List of unsigned state highways in Mississippi

M
Maps of Mississippi
commons:Category:Maps of Mississippi
Mass media in Mississippi
Mississippi  website
:Category:Mississippi
commons:Category:Mississippi
Mississippi Book Festival
Mississippi Freelance
Mississippi Highway 572
Mississippi in the American Civil War
Mississippi River
Mississippi SB 2179
Mississippi State Capitol
Mississippi State Sovereignty Commission
Mountains of Mississippi
commons:Category:Mountains of Mississippi
MS – United States Postal Service postal code for the state of Mississippi
Museums in Mississippi
:Category:Museums in Mississippi
commons:Category:Museums in Mississippi
Music of Mississippi
commons:Category:Music of Mississippi
:Category:Musical groups from Mississippi
:Category:Musicians from Mississippi

N
Natchez, Mississippi, first territorial capital 1798–1802, first state capital 1817-1821
Natchez Trace
National Forests of Mississippi
commons:Category:National Forests of Mississippi
Natural history of Mississippi
commons:Category:Natural history of Mississippi
Newspapers of Mississippi

O

P
People from Mississippi
:Category:People from Mississippi
commons:Category:People from Mississippi
:Category:People by city in Mississippi
:Category:People by county in Mississippi
:Category:People from Mississippi by occupation
Politics of Mississippi
commons:Category:Politics of Mississippi
Protected areas of Mississippi
commons:Category:Protected areas of Mississippi

Q

R
Radio stations in Mississippi
Railroads in Mississippi
Registered historic places in Mississippi
commons:Category:Registered Historic Places in Mississippi
:Category:Religion in Mississippi
commons:Category:Religion in Mississippi
Rivers of Mississippi
commons:Category:Rivers of Mississippi

S
Same-sex marriage in Mississippi
School districts of Mississippi
Scouting in Mississippi
Second Battle of Corinth
Senate of the State of Mississippi
Settlements in Mississippi
Cities in Mississippi
Towns in Mississippi
Villages in Mississippi
Census Designated Places in Mississippi
Other unincorporated communities in Mississippi
List of ghost towns in Mississippi
Siege of Corinth
Siege of Corinth Confederate order of battle
Siege of Corinth Union order of battle
Siege of Vicksburg
Skirmish at Abbeville
Slugburger
Sports in Mississippi
commons:Category:Sports in Mississippi
Sports venues in Mississippi
commons:Category:Sports venues in Mississippi
State Capitol of Mississippi
State highway routes in Mississippi
State of Mississippi  website
Constitution of the State of Mississippi
Government of the state of Mississippi
:Category:Government of Mississippi
commons:Category:Government of Mississippi
Executive branch of the government of the state of Mississippi
Governor of the state of Mississippi
Legislative branch of the government of the state of Mississippi
Legislature of the State of Mississippi
Senate of the State of Mississippi
House of Representatives of the State of Mississippi
Judicial branch of the government of the state of Mississippi
Supreme Court of the State of Mississippi
State parks of Mississippi
commons:Category:State parks of Mississippi
State prisons of Mississippi
Steele's Bayou expedition
Structures in Mississippi
commons:Category:Buildings and structures in Mississippi
Superfund sites in Mississippi
Supreme Court of the State of Mississippi
Symbols of the state of Mississippi
:Category:Symbols of Mississippi
commons:Category:Symbols of Mississippi

T
Telecommunications in Mississippi
commons:Category:Communications in Mississippi
Telephone area codes in Mississippi
Television shows set in Mississippi
Television stations in Mississippi
Tennessee Valley Authority
Territory of Mississippi
Theatre in Mississippi
commons:Category:Theatres in Mississippi
Tourism in Mississippi  website
commons:Category:Tourism in Mississippi
Trail of Tears, 1830–1838
Transportation in Mississippi
:Category:Transportation in Mississippi
commons:Category:Transport in Mississippi

U
United States of America
States of the United States of America
United States census statistical areas of Mississippi
United States congressional delegations from Mississippi
United States congressional districts in Mississippi
United States Court of Appeals for the Fifth Circuit
United States District Court for the Northern District of Mississippi
United States District Court for the Southern District of Mississippi
United States representatives from Mississippi
United States senators from Mississippi
Universities and colleges in Mississippi
commons:Category:Universities and colleges in Mississippi
U.S. highway routes in Mississippi
Unsigned state highways in Mississippi
US-MS – ISO 3166-2:US region code for the state of Mississippi

V
Vehicle registration plates of Mississippi
Vietnamese in Mississippi

W
Washington, Mississippi, territorial capital 1802-1817
Water parks in Mississippi
White's Slough
Wikimedia
Wikimedia Commons:Category:Mississippi
commons:Category:Maps of Mississippi
Wikinews:Category:Mississippi
Wikinews:Portal:Mississippi
Wikipedia Category:Mississippi
Wikipedia Portal:Mississippi
Wikipedia:WikiProject Mississippi
:Category:WikiProject Mississippi articles
:Category:WikiProject Mississippi members

X

Y

Z
Zoos in Mississippi
commons:Category:Zoos in Mississippi

See also

Topic overview:
Mississippi
Outline of Mississippi

Mississippi
 
Mississippi